Alien Worlds was a syndicated radio show created by radio personality Lee Hansen. It aired 26 half-hour episodes between 1979 and 1980, becoming well known for its realistic sound effects, high production values and documentary style of dialog. J. Michael Straczynski was one of the writers.

Background
The science fiction show was first syndicated by Watermark Inc. after Lee Hansen was hired as their creative director. After advancing the concept of an action-adventure dramatic radio series, Lee began developing the concept in the fall of 1978. Watermark premiered the first episode, "The Sun Stealers", on January 7, 1979.

The series gained popularity thanks to its relatable characters, full symphonic soundtrack, realistic sound effects, high production values and documentary style format. Eventually over 500 US FM radio stations, along with stations in New Zealand and Australia aired the series. Between 1979 and 1980, 26 half-hour programs were broadcast at various times on weekends, where they gained favorable worldwide press acclaim. Alien Worlds was soon heard on a weekly basis by millions of fans and was eventually carried by over 1500 top-rated FM radio stations worldwide. The series' sponsor was Peter Paul, Cadbury which advertised Cadbury Caramello chocolates touting their caramel centers.

Four additional episodes were produced but never aired. The show was previously repeated on Sirius Satellite Radio, and on the Alien Worlds website (which since closed). The series is being developed for 3-D animation for television and DVD release.

Plot summary
The ISA, or International Space Authority, is a governing body of space development and exploration. Organized by all earth nations, it advances humans into deep space. Their base is officially named "The Arthur C. Clarke Astronomical Observatory" or "Starlab". Commissioner White commands the base, and under his command aboard Starlab are Research Director Dr. Maura Cassidy along with Starlab's Director of Operations, Jerry Lyden, and two ISA pilots affectionately known as "rocket jockies", Captains Jon Graydon and Buddy Griff.

Production

Cast
 Roger Dressler as Narrator & Commissioner Matthew White
 Linda Gary as Maura Cassidy
 Bruce Phillip Miller as SET Captain Jon Graydon
 Corey Burton as Starlab Controller Jerry Lyden & Research Assistant Tim
 Chuck Olsen as SET Captain Buddy Griff

Soundtrack
The original music score and theme, entitled The Aliens World Suite, was composed by Jim Kirk and engineered by Dick Lewzey. It was performed by the London Symphony Orchestra, comprising a 57 piece Westminster Sinfonia in Wembley, England.

Many of the realistic sound effects were recorded in four different sessions on an oil tanker in a San Pedro dry dock.

Episode List 
Alien Worlds - 0001 - AWB-791-1 - 79-01-6/7 - The Sun Stealers - Part 1

Alien Worlds - 0002 - AWB-791-2 - 79-01-13/14 - The Sun Stealers - Part 2

Alien Worlds - 0003 - AWB-791-3 - 79-01-20/21 - The Starsmith Project - Part 1

Alien Worlds - 0004 - AWB-791-4 - 79-01-27/28 - The Starsmith Project - Part 2

Alien Worlds - 0005 - AWB-791-5 - 79-02-3/4  - The Night Riders Of Kalimar - Part 1

Alien Worlds - 0006 - AWB-791-6 - 79-02-10/11 - The Night Riders Of Kalimar - Part 2 

Alien Worlds - 0007 - AWB-791-7 - 79-02-17/18 - The Resurrectionists Of Lethe Part 1

Alien Worlds - 0008 - AWB-791-8 - 79-02-24/25 - The Resurrectionists Of Lethe - Part 2

Alien Worlds - 0009 - AWB-791-9 - 79-03-3/4 - The Keeper Of Eight - Part 1

Alien Worlds - 0010 - AWB-791-10 - 79-03-10/11 - The Keeper Of Eight - Part 2

Alien Worlds - 0011 - AWB-791-11 - 79-03-17/18 - ISA Conspiracy - Part 1 "The Darkbringers"

Alien Worlds - 0012 - AWB-791-12 - 79-03-24/25 - The ISA Conspiracy - Part 2 "The Deitons"

Alien Worlds - 0013 - AWB-791-13 - 79-03-31/79-04-1 - ISA Conspiracy - Part 3 "Lightstorm"

Alien Worlds - 0014 - AWB-793-1 - 79-07-7/8 - The Kilohertz War

Alien Worlds - 0015 - AWB-793-2 - 79-07-14/15 - The Adventure Of The Egyptian Necklace - Part 1

Alien Worlds - 0016 - AWB-793-3 - 79-07-21/22 - The Adventure Of The Egyptian Necklace - Part 2

Alien Worlds - 0017 - AWB-793-4 - 79-07-28/29 - Time Clash

Alien Worlds - 0018 - AWB-793-5 - 79-08-04/5 - Deathsong

Alien Worlds - 0019 - AWB-793-6 - 79-08-11/12 - The Infinity Factor - Part 1

Alien Worlds - 0020 - AWB-793-7 - 79-08-18/19 - The Infinity Factor - Part 2

Alien Worlds - 0021 - AWB-793-8 - 79-08-25/26 - Earthlight - Part 1

Alien Worlds - 0022 - AWB-793-9 - 79-09-1/2 - Earthlight - Part 2

Alien Worlds - 0023 - AWB-793-10 - 79-09-9/10 - The Seeds Of Time

Alien Worlds - 0024 - AWB-793-11 - 79-09-15/16 - The Madonnas Of Zanzabar Alpha - Part 1

Alien Worlds - 0025 - AWB-793-12 - 79-09-22/23 - The Madonnas Of Zanzabar Alpha - Part 2

Alien Worlds - 0026 - AWB-793-13 - 79-09-29/30 - The Himalayan Parallel (Last broadcast show)

Alien Worlds - 000X - 79-10-00 - A Dream Within A Dream (Not Aired)

Alien Worlds - 000X - 79-10-00 - A Question Of Conscience (Not Aired)

Alien Worlds - 000X - 79-11-00 - The Lukocyte Manuver (Not Aired)

Alien Worlds - 000X - 79-12-00 - The Parallax Deception (Not Aired)

References

External links
OTR Plot Spot: Alien Worlds - plot summaries and reviews.
Alien Worlds Episodes
Alien Worlds Information Page - Episode details, distribution and cast information.

American radio dramas
American science fiction radio programs
Works about astronauts
1970s American radio programs